Mareuil is the name or part of the name of the following communes in France:

 Mareuil, Charente, in the Charente department
 Mareuil, Dordogne, in the Dordogne department
 Mareuil-Caubert, in the Somme department
 Mareuil-en-Brie, in the Marne department
 Mareuil-en-Dôle, in the Aisne department
 Mareuil-la-Motte, in the Oise department
 Mareuil-le-Port, in the Marne department
 Mareuil-lès-Meaux, in the Seine-et-Marne department
 Mareuil-sur-Arnon, in the Cher department
 Mareuil-sur-Ay, in the Marne department
 Mareuil-sur-Cher, in the Loir-et-Cher department
 Mareuil-sur-Lay-Dissais, in the Vendée department
 Mareuil-sur-Ourcq, in the Oise department
 Bray-lès-Mareuil, in the Somme department
 Sainte-Croix-de-Mareuil, in the Dordogne department
 Saint-Sulpice-de-Mareuil, in the Dordogne department
 Vieux-Mareuil, in the Dordogne department